Laksam Railway Junction is one of the five biggest junctions of Bangladesh. A junction, in the context of rail transport, is a place at which two or more rail routes converge or diverge. Rail transport operations refer to stations that lie on or near a railway junction as a junction station. Laksam is a junction station.

References

Railway junction stations in Bangladesh
Railway stations in Chittagong Division